The 2005 European Junior Badminton Championships were held in Den Bosch, Netherlands, between March 19 and March 27, 2005.

Medalists

Results

Semi-finals

Finals

External links
Badminton England
Badminton Europe: European Junior Championships-Individuals

European Junior Badminton Championships
European Junior Badminton Championships
European Junior Badminton Championships
2005 European Junior Badminton Championships